Aam Aadmi Party Delhi or AAP Delhi is a state wing of Aam Aadmi Party. AAP became a state party in Delhi in 2013.

The party contested its first election in Delhi in 2013 and was successful in winning 28 seats in a hung assembly. It got outside support from Indian National Congress and Arvind Kejriwal became the Chief Minister of Delhi but he resigned after 49 days due to differences with INC. In the following 2015 elections, AAP won 67 of the 70 seats in the assembly, limiting BJP at just 3 seats and INC with none and Kejriwal was sworn in as the Chief Minister of Delhi. AAP formed the government again in the subsequent 2020 Delhi Legislative Assembly election, winning 62 seats.

Electoral Performances

2013 Delhi Legislative Assembly Elections 
The 2013 Delhi state assembly elections were the party's first electoral contest. The Election Commission approved the symbol of a broom for use by the AAP in that campaign. The party said that its candidates were honest and had been screened for potential criminal backgrounds. It published its central manifesto on 20 November 2013, promising to implement the Jan Lokpal Bill within 15 days of coming to power.

In November 2013, a sting operation conducted by Media Sarkar alleged that several leaders of the AAP, including Kumar Vishwas and Shazia Ilmi, had agreed to extend their support to some people seeking assistance with land deals and other financial arrangements in return for donations in cash to the AAP. Ilmi offered to withdraw her candidature as a result, but the party refused to accept her offer, describing the footage as fabricated and a violation of the Model Code of Conduct.  The AAP emerged as the second-largest party in Delhi, winning 28 of the 70 Assembly seats; the Bharatiya Janata Party, as the largest party, won 31, while its ally Shiromani Akali Dal, won 1; Indian National Congress won 8, and two were won by others. On 28 December 2013, the AAP formed a minority government in the hung Assembly, with what Sheila Dikshit describes as "not unconditional" support from Indian National Congress. Kejriwal became the second-youngest Chief Minister of Delhi. As a result of the Delhi elections, AAP became a recognised state party in Delhi.

2014 Indian general election in Delhi 
AAP lost on all 7 seats and came 2nd on each seat. Its vote share was 32%.

2015 Delhi Legislative Assembly Elections 
The Delhi state assembly elections for the Sixth Legislative Assembly of Delhi were held on 7 February 2015, as declared by the Election Commission of India. The Aam Aadmi Party scored a landslide victory by winning a majority of 67 of the 70 seats. The BJP was able to win 3 seats and the Congress party saw all its candidates lose. Kejriwal became the Chief Minister for the second time. The AAP had started campaigning in Delhi in November 2014 and declared candidates for all 70 seats.

During the campaign, Kejriwal claimed that the BJP had been trying to bribe AAP volunteers. He asked Delhi voters to not deny the bribes offered to them. He suggested that voters should accept the bribe from others and yet vote for AAP through the secret ballot in the election. The situation caused the Election Commission of India to instruct Kejriwal to desist from breaking laws governing the model code of conduct for elections in India, but the Delhi court then allowed Kejriwal to challenge this.

The President's Rule was subsequently rescinded and Kejriwal became the Chief Minister of Delhi with six cabinet ministers (Manish Sisodia, Asim Ahmed Khan, Sandeep Kumar, Satyendar Jain, Gopal Rai, and Jitender Singh Tomar).

2019 Indian general election in Delhi 
AAP lost on all seats and lost deposits on 3 seats. Its vote share was 18.11%.

2020 Delhi Legislative Assembly Elections 
AAP contested 2020 Delhi Legislative Assembly Elections on all 70 seats and won 62 seats. Arvind Kejriwal took oath as CM for the 3rd time on 16 February 2020. AAP secured 53.57% votes. Its main opponent BJP and Congress secured 38.51% and 4.26% votes respectively.

List of AAP MLAs from Delhi 

^ resigned for Rajya Sabha on 24 March 2022

List of AAP MPs from Delhi in Rajya Sabha

List of Ministers

References

Aam Aadmi Party
Aam Aadmi Party MLAs from Delhi
Aam Aadmi Party politicians from Delhi
Aam Aadmi Party candidates in the 2020 Delhi Legislative Assembly election